Ahmed Ayman Mohamed Mansour (born 13 April 1994), is an Egyptian footballer who plays for Egyptian Premier League side Pyramids and the Egyptian national team as a defender.

International
He made his debut for the Egypt national football team on 23 March 2019 in an Africa Cup qualifier against Niger, as a starter.

Personal life
Ahmed is the son of former Egypt and Zamalek forward Ayman Mansour.

References

External links

1996 births
Living people
Footballers from Cairo
Egyptian footballers
Egypt international footballers
Association football defenders
Egyptian Premier League players
Egypt youth international footballers
Tala'ea El Gaish SC players
El Dakhleya SC players
Al Masry SC players
Pyramids FC players
2019 Africa Cup of Nations players